Sylvain Abitbol is an engineer and entrepreneur in the telecommunications industry as CEO of NHC Communications Inc but is best known as an activist in Jewish affairs and was co-president of the Canadian Jewish Congress from 2007 to 2009.

Abitbol graduated from Montreal's Ecole Polytechnique in 1973 with a degree in Industrial and Mechanical Engineering.

He was employed by Xerox for six years and received training in telecommunications at the company's training centre in El Segundo, California.

Abitbol is a member of Montreal's Sephardic Jewish community and became president of Montreal's Federation CJA in 2004. His family immigrated to Montreal from Morocco after the Six-Day War in 1967.

References

Living people
Canadian Jewish Congress
Jewish Canadian activists
20th-century Moroccan Jews
Businesspeople from Montreal
Moroccan expatriates in Canada
Canadian people of Moroccan-Jewish descent
Engineers from Quebec
Canadian mechanical engineers
Canadian industrial engineers
École Polytechnique alumni
20th-century Canadian engineers
21st-century Canadian engineers
Year of birth missing (living people)